Everything Must Go may refer to:

Film and television
 Everything Must Go (film), a 2010 American film starring Will Ferrell
 "Everything Must Go" (Good Girls), a television episode
 "Everything Must Go" (How I Met Your Mother), a television episode

Music
 Everything Must Go (Manic Street Preachers album), 1996
 "Everything Must Go" (song), the title song
 Everything Must Go (Steely Dan album) or the title song, 2003
 Everything Must Go (Vol. 1), a mixtape by T-Pain, 2018
 "Everything Must Go", a song by Dizzee Rascal from Raskit, 2017
 "Everything Must Go", a song by Taking Back Sunday from New Again, 2009
 "Everything Must Go!", a song by the Weakerthans from Left and Leaving, 2000

Other uses
 Everything Must Go (novel), a 1969 novel by Keith Waterhouse
 "Everything Must Go!", a graffiti mural by Daniel Doherty in the Mission District of San Francisco, California